"Damage from the Inside" is the seventh episode and mid-season finale of the sixth season of the post-apocalyptic horror television series Fear the Walking Dead, which aired on AMC on November 22, 2020, in the United States.

Plot 
A convoy of rangers escorting Dakota to safety is attacked and killed, leaving Strand and a ranger named Samuels as the only survivors. Strand enlists Alicia and Charlie's help in finding Dakota, who they locate in an old hunting lodge occupied by a taxidermist named Ed, who has used his taxidermy skills to dress up walkers around his horned lodge to scare people. Alicia contacts Virginia and offers to trade Dakota for her freedom, intending to retake the stadium, but Ed becomes angry, lures the walkers, and refuses to let them go.

During a fight, Alicia accidentally impales him on antlers and Ed sacrifices himself to the approaching walkers. Morgan appears and helps Alicia eliminate the walkers, but he intends to trade Dakota for the rest of his people, leading to an argument when Alicia realizes that Morgan attacked the convoy. Morgan agrees to take Dakota with them to the place he is building, but Strand refuses to come and stays with Virginia and the Pioneers. Virginia brings Strand to Grace, visibly pregnant, and tells him that she wants him to get everyone she took from Humbug's Gulch.

Reception 
Emily Hannemann of TV Insider rated the episode 4 out of 5 stars, writing: "While it was a little slow at times, “Damage From the Inside” did a great job of showing the "dark sides" of Alicia, Morgan, and Strand. That, in combination with the neat-looking walkers, makes it the second-best episode this half-season." Paul Dailly of said the episode "worked very well as a midseason finale."

David S.E. Zapanta from Den of Geek! rated it 1.5 out of 5 ratings and wrote: "The last time I struggled to write a review for Fear the Walking Dead was the season 4 finale. I wrote at the time, 'Several false starts and a couple thousand words later, I realized I wasn’t writing a review for a lackluster episode. Rather, I was writing a eulogy for a show I once loved.'"

Ratings 
The episode was seen by 1.09 million viewers in the United States on its original air date, below the previous episodes.

References

External links

 "Damage from the Inside" at AMC.com
 

2020 American television episodes
Fear the Walking Dead (season 6) episodes